ε-Viniferin is a naturally occurring phenol, belonging to the stilbenoids family. It is a resveratrol dimer.

It is found in Vitis vinifera grapevines, in wines, in the Oriental medicinal plant Vitis coignetiae and in the stem bark of Dryobalanops aromatica.
Cis-epsilon-viniferin can be found in Paeonia lactiflora.

It shows a human cytochrome P450 enzymes inhibition activity.

Glycosides 
Diptoindonesin A is a C-glucoside of ε-viniferin.

See also 
 Phenolic content in wine

References

External links

e-viniferin on phenol-explorer.eu

Resveratrol oligomers
Stilbenoid dimers
Grape
Wine chemistry
Cytochrome P450 inhibitors